The Indian Agricultural Research Institute (IARI), commonly known as the Pusa Institute, is India's national institute for agricultural research, education and extension. The name Pusa Institute is derived from the fact that the institute was originally located in Pusa, Bihar as the Imperial Institute of Agricultural Research in 1911. It was then renamed as the Imperial Agricultural Research Institute in 1919 and following a major earthquake in Pusa, it was relocated to Delhi in 1936. The current institute in Delhi is financed and administered by the  Indian Council of Agricultural Research (ICAR). The IARI was responsible for the research leading to the "Green Revolution in India" of the 1970s.

History

The institute was established in 1905 at Pusa, Bihar, with the financial assistance of Henry Phipps, Jr., an American philanthropist. Phipps was a family friend of Lady Curzon, the daughter of an American millionaire, and the wife of Lord Curzon, the Viceroy of India. Phipps stayed as a guest of the Curzons during his visit to India. More importantly, Phipps left behind with them a donation of  £30,000, which was used to establish the institute. He laid the foundation stone of the Agricultural Research Institute and college on 1 April 1905.
The institute was originally called the Agricultural Research Institute (ARI). Its name was changed to the Imperial Institute of Agricultural Research in 1911, and to the Imperial Agricultural Research Institute in 1919.
A reason for establishing it in Pusa in northern Bihar was the proximity to the indigo plantations which were in need of revival after the German synthesis of aniline in 1899. One of the first scientists to be deputed to the institute was the English chemist John Walter Leather in 1892.

However, the institute was damaged during the devastating Bihar earthquake of 15 January 1934. The Secretary of State approved the transfer in July, 1934. B. Viswanath was the director at that time. He also happened to be first Indian director of IARI. The new campus at New Delhi was inaugurated on 29 July 1936, while the new building of the Imperial Institute of Agricultural Research was inaugurated by the then Viceroy of India, Lord Linlithgow on 7 November 1936.

Post-independence: 1947–present

Post-independence, the institute was renamed the Indian Agricultural Research Institute, and in 1950 the Shimla sub-station of institute developed Rust-resistant varieties of wheat, including Pusa 718, 737, 745, and 760. In 1958, it was recognized as a "deemed university" under the UGC act of 1956 of Parliament and since then it has awarded MSc and PhD degrees.

What remained of the institute at the original location was downgraded to an agricultural research station until 1970, when the Government of Bihar established the Rajendra Agricultural University at the location.

Campus

This was initially outside Delhi, but over the decades the city has grown much beyond the campus. Indian Agricultural Statistics Research Institute is affiliated with and is located in the campus of the Indian Agricultural Research Institute.

Schools at IARI
 School of Crop Improvement
 School of Plant Protection
 School of Basic Sciences
 School of Natural Resource Management
 School of Social Sciences
 School of Horticultural Science

See also

 Pusa 1121 rice
 Van Vigyan Kendra Forest Science Centres

References

External links

 IARI Assistant Recruitment for 462 Post Apply now
 IARI website

Research institutes in Delhi
Agricultural universities and colleges in India
Universities and colleges in Delhi
Research institutes established in 1905
Agricultural research institutes in India
Indian Council of Agricultural Research
Deemed universities in India
Agriculture in Delhi
1905 establishments in India